Mar Ignatius Gabriel I Tappouni (Arabic: جبرائيل تبّوني) (3 November 1879 – 29 January 1968) was a leading prelate of the Syriac Catholic Church. He served as Patriarch of Antioch from 1929 to 1968, and was elevated to the cardinalate in 1935.

Biography
Born Abdul-Ahad Dawood Tappouni, Baptized as Leo Gabriel, Tappouni was born in Mosul (in modern Iraq) and there studied at the Syro-Chaldean Dominican Seminary. He was ordained to the priesthood on 3 November 1902, taking the name Dominic. After teaching at the same seminary until 1908, Tappouni was then made Secretary of the Apostolic Delegation to Mesopotamia.

On 12 September 1912, he was appointed Titular Bishop of Danaba and the Chaldean Apostolic Vicar of Mardin. Tappouni was reassigned as Titular Bishop of Batnae dei Siri on 19 January 1913, which was the same date he received his episcopal consecration from Patriarch Ignatius Ephrem II Rahmani. At his consecration he took the name Theophile Gabriel. During World War I, he was imprisoned by the Ottoman Turks in Aleppo during an Ottoman campaign to slaughter Christians.  Many people attempted to interfere and negotiate for Tappouni's release, including Emperor Franz Joseph of Austria.

After his release, he was named Archbishop of Aleppo by Patriarch Rahmani on 24 February 1921. On 24 June Tappouni was unanimously chosen by the Syrian Synod to replace the late Rahmani as Patriarch of Antioch, the leader of the Syriac Catholic Church. Pope Pius XI confirmed his election on 15 July and created him Cardinal Priest of Ss. XII Apostoli in the consistory of 16 December 1935. Tappouni, who took the name Ignatius Gabriel, was the first Eastern Rite prelate to enter the College of Cardinals since 1895.

Around 1945, he was sentenced to death by one of the axis countries, but the sentence was never carried out as the axis government was abolished because of the end of world war 2.

Tappouni was one of the cardinal electors in the 1939 papal conclave, which selected Pope Pius XII, and again voted in the 1958 conclave, which selected Pope John XXIII. From 1962 to 1965, he attended the Second Vatican Council and sat on its Board of Presidency. After serving as a cardinal elector in the 1963 conclave, Tappouni resigned his cardinal's titular church (Ss. XII Apostoli) on 11 February 1965 when he was raised to the rank of cardinal bishop pursuant to Pope Paul VI's motu propio Ad Purpuratorum Patrum issued on that day which decreed that Eastern Patriarchs elevated to the College of Cardinals would be cardinal bishops, ranked after the suburbicarian cardinal-bishops, and maintain their patriarchal sees and not receive any assignment to associate them with the Diocese of Rome.

He died in Lebanon at age 88, and is buried at the Syriac Catholic Monastery of Charfeh in Daraoun, Lebanon.

Theologically conservative, Tappouni urged Cardinal Giuseppe Siri to put forward his candidacy at the conclave of 1963.

Notes

References

Literature
The Journal of The Syriac Catholic Parish of Aleppo.
Pham, John-Peter. "Heirs of the Fisherman: Behind the Scenes of Papal Death and Succession". Oxford University Press, 2007.

External links
Catholic-Hierarchy
Cardinals of the Holy Roman Church
TIME Magazine - "A Test of Good Will"

Iraqi cardinals
1879 births
1968 deaths
Syriac Catholic Patriarchs of Antioch
Participants in the Second Vatican Council
People from Mosul
Iraqi Eastern Catholics
Syriac Catholic bishops
Cardinals created by Pope Pius XI
Burials in Lebanon
20th-century Eastern Catholic bishops